Monte Alegre may refer to:

Places in Brazil:

Campina do Monte Alegre, São Paulo
Monte Alegre, Pará
Monte Alegre, Rio Grande do Norte
Monte Alegre dos Campos, Rio Grande do Sul 
Monte Alegre de Goiás, Goiás
Monte Alegre de Minas, Minas Gerais
Monte Alegre do Piauí, Piauí
Monte Alegre de Sergipe, Sergipe 
Monte Alegre do Sul, São Paulo

or:

 Monte Alegre (ship)